Sir William Edward Leonard Shenton (18 March 1885 – 20 November 1967) was an English solicitor who worked in Hong Kong.

Born in Morestead near Winchester, he was the son of William Shenton and Eleanor Johnson. He went to the Northgate School at St. Thomas, Hampshire around 1901. He arrived in Hong Kong in 1908 and rose to the head of the well-known Hong Kong legal firm of Deacons. He was also the chairman of the Union Insurance Society of Canton.

He was appointed member of the Executive Council and Legislative Council of Hong Kong temporarily in 1927 and again from 1928, until his retirement and returned to England in 1936. He was also member of the legal sub-committee of the Hong Kong General Chamber of Commerce. He was made Knight Bachelor in the New Year Honours of 1923.

He married Erica Lucy Denison, daughter of civil engineer Albert Denison of Hong Kong. He had one son and one daughter. His daughter, Yvonne Eleanor Mutch Shenton, a keen horse woman, was married to Cecil Edward Sanford Barclay, son of Sir Colville Barclay.

He died in 1967 in Isle of Wight, England.

References

1885 births
1967 deaths
Solicitors of Hong Kong
English solicitors
British expatriates in Hong Kong
Members of the Executive Council of Hong Kong
Members of the Legislative Council of Hong Kong
Knights Bachelor
People from Winchester
20th-century English lawyers
Lawyers from Hampshire